The National Socialist Workers Party of Iran, better known by its abbreviation SUMKA, was a Neo-Nazi party in Iran. The symbol of the event was a very simplified Faravahar, on their flag he appeared in a similar arrangement as on the NSDAP flag.

Foundation 

The party was formed in 1940 by Davud Monshizadeh and had a minor support base in Iranian universities. Critics of the late Mohammad Reza Pahlavi allege that he provided direct funding to the SUMKA at one point.

Development 
Monshizadeh formed the SUMKA in 1952 along with Morteza Kossarian. Monshizadeh had lived in Germany since 1937, and was a former SS member, who fought and was wounded in the Battle of Berlin. Kossarian was also a former SS Officer, who was part of the planning of Operation Barbarossa and subsequently fought at the Battle of Kiev and the Battle of Stalingrad, where he was injured. Monshizadeh was also a professor at Ludwig Maximilians University of Munich and was deeply influenced by Jose Ortega y Gasset's philosophy.
The SUMKA briefly attracted the support of young nationalists in Iran, including Dariush Homayoon, an early member who would later rise to prominence in the country.  SUMKA adopted the swastika and black shirt as part of their uniforms. 

They were firmly opposed to the rule of Mohammed Mossadegh during their brief period of influence, and the party worked alongside Fazlollah Zahedi in his opposition to Mossadegh. In 1953, they were part of a large group of Zahedi supporters who marched towards the palace of Mohammad Reza Pahlavi demanding the ousting of Mossadegh. The party would become associated with street violence against the supporters of Mossadegh and the Tudeh Party.

Shock troops 
The party had an "assault group" (guruhe hamle) with an estimated size of 100 members that openly attacked members of the communist Tudeh Party of Iran and the Soviet Cultural Center and Hungarian Trade Office in Tehran. Colonel Fateh, a retired officer of the Imperial Iranian Air Force, was responsible for training the unit.

Financial sources
Colonel Fateh was the official patron of the SUMKA. After the 1953 Iranian coup d'état, the party received a monthly stipend of 2,500 Iranian rial from the police and other security authorities. In 1958, Monshizadeh received $7,000 from SAVAK to go to the United States. The party was also possibly financed by foreign embassies based in Iran. In April 1952, Iranian police reported that Monshizadeh was seeking to establish ties with the British embassy to get financial support. It was allegedly funded by the Central Intelligence Agency (CIA) through TPBEDAMN.

Legacy 
Advocates of Nazism continue to exist in Iran and are active mainly on the Internet. As of 2010, they are reported to be a small yet slowly increasing minority of Iranian youths internationally.

Gallery

Party branches

Image Gallery

See also 

 Azure Party
 Aria Party
 Pan-Iranist Party

References

1952 establishments in Iran
Anti-Arabism in Asia
Anti-capitalist political parties
Anti-communist parties
Antisemitism in Iran
Far-right political parties
Fascism in Iran
Iranian nationalism
Nationalist parties in Iran
Neo-Nazi political parties
Neo-Nazism in Asia
Political parties established in 1952
Political parties in Pahlavi Iran (1941–1979)
Anti-Islam sentiment in Iran